Paopi 7 - Coptic Calendar - Paopi 9

The eighth day of the Coptic month of Paopi, the second month of the Coptic year. On a common year, this day corresponds to October 5, of the Julian Calendar, and October 18, of the Gregorian Calendar. This day falls in the Coptic season of Akhet, the season of inundation.

Commemorations

Saints 

 The martyrdom of Saint Matra 
 The martyrdom of Saint Abba Hur, his wife Saint Tosia, and their children 
 The departure of Saint Agathon the Hermit

References 

Days of the Coptic calendar